FlatOut is a 2004 racing video game developed by the Finnish developer Bugbear Entertainment and published by Empire Interactive, with Vivendi Universal Games distributing in North America. Gameplay in FlatOut places emphasis on demolition derby-style races, and features a sophisticated physics engine. 16 different cars are included, each with 5 different skins for them. The game is most known for car drivers flying through the windshield. It was published by Konami on October 13, 2005.

In 2014, a Linux version of the game was released on GOG.com as part of the launch of Linux support.

Features
Modes in FlatOut include standard lap races, in either open environments or stadium laps, and demolition derby deathmatches, in which the driver of the sole-surviving vehicle declared the winner; both modes pit players against 7 computer-controlled opponents. The game also includes special events which require the player to toss the driver off of his/her vehicle and meet certain requirements. In career mode, pick up your future top racer from the junkyard. Winnings come in the form of cash, which allows players to purchase vehicle upgrades and new vehicles.

FlatOut is noted for its extensive use of physics in vehicle damage and collisions; dents on vehicles may vary based on the type of accident, object and angle of impact (falling objects, for example, will damage mostly the upper areas of a car), while many roadside items react better to collisions from other vehicles.

Ragdoll physics is also present in the game, with drivers capable of being tossed out of their car after high-impact crashes. This feature is extensively used in several special events, when the player is required to "toss" a driver to a specific distance, height, or target.

Reception

FlatOut received "mixed or average" reviews on all platforms according to the review aggregation website Metacritic. In Japan, Famitsu gave the PlayStation 2 version a score of all four sevens for a total of 28 out of 40.

The Sydney Morning Herald gave the game a score of four-and-a-half stars out of five and stated: "The handling is remarkable, and the fact the tracks are littered with obstacles that bounce and crash realistically makes it all the more fun. Throw in excellent damage modelling and it's plain to see that this game has nailed the core mechanics of an addictive racer perfectly". The Times gave the PS2 and Xbox versions a score of four stars out of five and wrote that the truly suicidal "will be in awe of the driver's ability to launch himself fatally through the windscreen, screaming, while the rest of us will love the game's easy and responsive controls, and the authentic feel of the cars". Detroit Free Press, however, gave the Xbox version a score of two stars out of four and said that "if [the game] were only a $20 title, I'd heartily recommend it. But $50 is a lot of money to pay to turn yourself into road splatter over and over again. It's flawed, though fun". Maxim gave the game a score of two stars out of five and said it was "about as interesting as a public service announcement for seatbelts".

FlatOut was selected in 2017 for a collection of 100 classical Finnish games, which were presented on the opening of the Finnish Museum of Games in Tampere.

Sequels
A sequel, FlatOut 2, was released first, in Europe, on June 30, 2006. A larger variety of vehicles (including contemporary cars and pickup trucks) are included. The North American version was launched on August 1.

In 2007 Bugbear released FlatOut: Ultimate Carnage, an enhanced remake of FlatOut 2, for Xbox 360. The Microsoft Windows version was released on August 1, 2008.

On November 2010, Team6 Game Studios released a new game titled FlatOut for the Wii. The game was met with negative reviews.

The third entry, FlatOut 3: Chaos & Destruction, developed by Team6 Game Studios and published by Strategy First in December 2011 exclusively for Microsoft Windows. The game received overwhelmingly negative reviews.

Flatout Stuntman is the Android-exclusive ragdoll game in the series. It was developed and published by Team6 Game Studios, and released in November 2013.

FlatOut 4: Total Insanity developed by Kylotonn for the PlayStation 4, Xbox One, and Microsoft Windows was released in March 2017. The game was met with mixed reviews.

Notes

References

External links
 

2004 video games
Bugbear Entertainment games
01
Linux games
Lua (programming language)-scripted video games
Multiplayer and single-player video games
Multiplayer hotseat games
PlayStation 2 games
Vehicular combat games
Video games developed in Finland
Video games featuring protagonists of selectable gender
Windows games
Xbox games
Empire Interactive games